Brachyspira innocens is a species of bacteria. It is thought to be a commensal bacterium.

References

External links
Bacterio entry
Straininfo entry
GBIF entry
Brachyspira innocens entry
EOL entry

Spirochaetes
Bacteria described in 1992